Vasili Stepanovich Popov - Popowski (1743–1822) was an Imperial Russian general and statesman who presided over the office of Prince Potemkin.

Bazyli Popowski vel Vasili Popov was born in the Polish noble family of the Pobóg coat of arms.

The father of Bazyli Popowski was Szczepan Popowski, a state official in Kazan.

Szczepan Popowski was born in the family estate of Popovo - Kuligóv, today Popowo-Parcele in Poland in Mazovia.

The owner of the Popovo - Kuligov estate was Aleksander Popowski, father of Szczepan Popowski.

In 1792 Popov advised Empress Catherine II of Russia on Polish affairs. It was he who authored the Targowicka Confederation founding act. Emperor Paul appointed him senator. Popov had large estates in the Ukraine, where the town of Vasylivka bears his name. It was his grandson who built Popov Castle there.

References

Księga zakroczymska grodzka nr 110, 1745, Archiwum Główne Akt Dawnych w Warszawie - Book of the town of Zakroczym, No. 110, 1745, Central Archives of Historical Records in Warsaw

1743 births
1822 deaths
People from Kazan Governorate
Members of the State Council (Russian Empire)
Politicians of the Russian Empire
Imperial Russian Army generals
Russian city founders
Russian people of the Bar Confederation
Recipients of the Order of St. Vladimir, 1st class
Recipients of the Order of St. Vladimir, 3rd class